Empress Eugenie refers to the Empress Eugénie de Montijo, wife of Emperor Napoleon III of France.

It can also refer to

 Empress Eugénie (diamond),  a gemstone which once belonged to her
 Empress Eugenie Archipelago, a group of islands in the Russian Far East named for her